Johann (Hans) Schalk (19 September 1903 – 9 November 1987) was a flying ace and high-ranking officer in the German Luftwaffe during World War II. He is credited with 15 aerial victories, 4 of which on the Eastern Front, claimed in 163 combat missions.

Early life and career
Schalk joined the Austrian Bundesheer in 1922 and as a Leutnant was trained to fly in 1928 and transferred to the Luftstreitkräfte. He became a leader of a fighter squadron in August 1933 and was appointed commander of the Austrian Jagdgruppe 1 (1st fighter group). He was one of the best Austrian aerobatic pilots and gained experience at various delegations to Germany and Italy. After the Anschluss, the annexation of Austria and the integration of the Bundesheer into the German Wehrmacht.

On 1 July 1938, Schalk was tasked with the creation of IV.(leichte) Gruppe (4th light group) of Jagdgeschwader 134 "Horst Wessel" (JG 134—134th Fighter Wing) at Dortmund. The unit was initially equipped with the Arado Ar 68 biplane fighter but shortly after converted to the Messerschmitt Bf 109 D-1. On 5 September, Schalk was ordered to relocate the Gruppe to Neisse, present-day Nysa, Poland, where it was renamed on 1 November and became the III. Gruppe of Zerstörergeschwader 142 (ZG 142—142nd Destroyer Wing). That day, the unit was ordered to Lippstadt Airfield. On 1 May 1939, the Gruppe was again renamed and became the III. Gruppe of Zerstörergeschwader 26 (ZG 26—26th Destroyer Wing). In August 1939, Schalk moved his Gruppe to Neumünster.

World War II
World War II began at 04:45 on Friday 1 September 1939 when German forces crossed the Polish border. Schalk claimed his first aerial victory over a French Morane-Saulnier M.S.406 fighter on 12 May 1940 near Ghent during the Battle of France. He claimed two further victories during the Battle of France and six during the Battle of Britain, three of which were shot down by his wireless radio operator Unteroffizier Hans Scheuplein. Schalk claimed his seventh aerial victory on 24 August, a Royal Air Force Hawker Hurricane fighter from No. 151 Squadron.

Schalk was the first member of the Luftwaffe to receive the Honour Goblet of the Luftwaffe. He was also one of the first Zerstörer (destroyer) pilot to receive the Knight's Cross of the Iron Cross on 11 September 1940 after nine aerial victories. The other two Zerstörer pilots who had received the Knight's Cross in September 1940 were Joachim-Friedrich Huth and Walter Grabmann.

Night fighter force
On 29 March 1941, Schalk was given the position of Geschwaderkommodore (wing commander) of Nachtjagdgeschwader 3 (NJG 3—3rd Night Fighter Wing). He held this position until 1 August 1943 when he transferred command to Major Helmut Lent. Schalk was then given the position of Jagdfliegerführer 2 (Chief of Fighter Aviation, Air Fleet 2), the commander of the Fighter forces of a Luftflotte.

Summary of career

Aerial victory claims
Mathews and Foreman, authors of Luftwaffe Aces — Biographies and Victory Claims, researched the German Federal Archives and state that Schalk was credited with 15 aerial victory claims with four aerial victories on the Eastern Front and 11 on the Western Front.

Awards
 Iron Cross (1939) 2nd and 1st class
 Honour Goblet of the Luftwaffe on 21 August 1940 as Oberstleutnant in Zerstörergeschwader 26
 Knight's Cross of the Iron Cross on 5 September 1940 as Oberstleutnant and Gruppenkommandeur of the III./Zerstörergeschwader 26 "Horst Wessel"

Notes

References

Citations

Bibliography

 
 
 
 
 
 
 
 
 
 
 

1903 births
1987 deaths
People from Krems an der Donau
Luftwaffe pilots
German World War II flying aces
Recipients of the Knight's Cross of the Iron Cross